Tercillat is a commune in the Creuse department in the Nouvelle-Aquitaine region in central France.

The seignurie of Tercillat was held by the noble family "de Noblet" from approximately 1576 to 1720 or more.

The feudal castle of Tercillat was a Commandery of the Knights Templar and the Order of Malta, consisting of conventual buildings, stables, oven, backyard, a fortified enclosure, towers, pits with the water, a drawbridge, a commandeur lodgings, a chapel, flanked by moats and dungeons. It was destroyed in the French Revolution. The ruins of the castle tower only remains.  Le Chateau du Puy was built with stones from the castle.

Geography
The commune borders the Indre département.

Population

Sights
 The church, rebuilt in the nineteenth century.
 The eighteenth-century Château du Puy.
 The ruins of the fourteenth-century chapel of Mas-St-Paul.
 The tower of the castle of Tercillat.

See also
Communes of the Creuse department

References

Communes of Creuse